Nelson Maldonado-Torres is a Puerto Rican philosopher and professor in Latino and Caribbean Studies and the Comparative Literature Program at Rutgers University. He received his PhD from Brown University in Religious Studies. His work has been influential in contributing to ideas about decoloniality decolonizing epistemology, and in critiquing Western liberalism and Eurocentrism. He is influenced by the works of Frantz Fanon, Emmanuel Levinas, and Enrique Dussel.

He critiques the notion of representational politics as being enough to contribute to systemic change. His work has been described as "animated by an ethic of decolonial love." He is also noted for contributing to discourse on the decolonial turn.

Career 
He was the head of the Caribbean Philosophical Association from 2008 to 2013. He was one of the signatories to support the creation for a Latina/o Academy of Arts and Sciences in the United States.

Publications

Books 

 Against War: Views from the Underside of Modernity (2008)
 La descolonización y el giro de(s)colonial (2012)

Select articles 

 "On the coloniality of being: Contributions to the development of a concept" (2007)
 "Thinking through the decolonial turn: Post-continental interventions in theory, philosophy, and critique—An introduction" (2011)
 "Outline of ten theses on coloniality and decoloniality" (2016)

References 

Year of birth missing (living people)
Puerto Rican academics
Decolonial feminism
University of Puerto Rico alumni
Brown University alumni
Postcolonial theorists
Rutgers University faculty
Living people